Union Township is a township in Republic County, Kansas, in the United States.

History
Union Township was organized in 1871.

References

Townships in Republic County, Kansas
Townships in Kansas